Messina is the third largest city in Sicily.

Messina may also refer to:

Places
 Province of Messina, a former Italian province
 Strait of Messina, Italy
 Messina, South Africa (now called Musina)
 Messina Chasmata, a system of canyons on the Uranian moon Titania

Other uses
 Messina (name), a surname
 Messina Conference, a 1955 conference which led to the creation of the European Economic Community
 Messina (album), a 2012 album by French singer-songwriter Damien Saez
 F.C. Messina Peloro, a football club based in Messina
 , a German cargo ship
 18 Infantry Division Messina, an Italian division during World War II
 Messina, a fictional small town in John Grisham's Bleachers

See also
Messenia, a region in Greece